The U.S. National Video Game Team (USNVGT) was founded in July 1983 in Ottumwa, Iowa, United States by Walter Day and Jim Riley as part of the Electronic Circus tour, with Steve Sanders as the first captain. After the Circus folded, Day re-established the team with himself as the captain, taking the team on a bus tour. The team challenged the players of arcades across the country and attempted to challenge other countries through visits to foreign embassies. In the years that followed the team ran numerous competitive contests.

History
The first annual U.S. National Video Game Team competition was held in 1985. Arcade video games at the competition included the fighting game Karate Champ (1984), the beat 'em up title Kung-Fu Master (1984), the run-and-gun shooter Commando (1985) and the sports video game Gridiron Fight (1985).

In 1986, the USNVGT continued on without Day under Jeff Peters and Steve Harris with Donn Nauert as team captain. The team extended their reach to include publishing the Top Score Newsletter and Electronic Game Player Magazine a short time later. Nauert appeared in television commercials for the Atari 7800 and served as the referee for Incredible Sunday on That's Incredible!, a three-game competition on the Nintendo Entertainment System that served as a precursor to the Nintendo World Championships 1990.

Publications

The U.S. National Video Game Team founded many publications in the 1980s. The first was the Top Score Newsletter (published by the Amusement Players Association), which was followed by the four-issue Electronic Game Player Magazine. In 1989, the Electronic Game Player Magazine format was improved and relaunched as Electronic Gaming Monthly. The USNVGT name appeared in the title of the magazine for the first several issues and within the magazine until 1995.

References

Esports teams based in the United States
Video game culture
1983 establishments in the United States